Erik Weissmann (Born May 27, 1978) is a Slovak former professional ice hockey player.

Career
Weissmann played in the Slovak Extraliga for HC Slovan Bratislava, HK Nitra, HKm Zvolen, HC Košice, HK Poprad and HC '05 Banská Bystrica. He also played in the Czech Extraliga for HC Zlín, HC Vítkovice and Slavia Praha, the Russian Superleague for HC Sibir Novosibirsk and the Kontinental Hockey League for HC Lada Togliatti.

While playing with HKm Zvolen during the 2005–06 Slovak Extraliga season, Weissmann topped the Slovak Extraliga with the most goals (30) and most points (59).

Career statistics

References

External links

1978 births
Living people
HC '05 Banská Bystrica players
Beibarys Atyrau players
SG Cortina players
Kazzinc-Torpedo players
HC Košice players
Krylya Sovetov Moscow players
HC Lada Togliatti players
Metallurg Zhlobin players
HC Nové Zámky players
HK Nitra players
SG Pontebba players
HK Poprad players
HC Sibir Novosibirsk players
HC Slavia Praha players
Slovak ice hockey left wingers
HC Slovan Bratislava players
Ice hockey people from Bratislava
HC Vítkovice players
PSG Berani Zlín players
HKM Zvolen players
Slovak expatriate ice hockey players in the Czech Republic
Slovak expatriate ice hockey players in Russia
Expatriate ice hockey players in Belarus
Expatriate ice hockey players in Italy
Expatriate ice hockey players in Kazakhstan
Slovak expatriate sportspeople in Italy
Slovak expatriate sportspeople in Kazakhstan
Slovak expatriate sportspeople in Belarus